Naam Ghosa is a Vaishnavite scripture of verses in praise of Lord Krishna. This book was written by Madhabdev in Assamese in about 1568–1596. It extols the practice of chanting the name of the deity as the most efficacious means of devotion.

The English version of this book subtitled as The Divine Verses translated by   Soroj Kumar Dutta in 1997. The second paperback edition of the book with an enriched glossary is available since 2017.
A bilingual version of the Namghosha (translated by Haramohan Das) was published in 1957 by the Vaishnava theological university ,Vrindavan .

References

External links

 The Sources of the Nām Ghosā at atributetosankaradeva.org.

Assamese literature
Bhakti movement
Books from Assam
Ekasarana Dharma